Harold K. Hoskins, Sr. (15 February 1927 Big Sandy, Texas – 1 May 2012) was an American pilot and Tuskegee Airman who was awarded the Congressional Gold Medal in 2007.  He trained during World War II and served during the Korean War and the Vietnam War. In 1945, he joined the U.S. Army at age 18 and learned to fly at Alabama's Tuskegee Army Air Field. In 1971, he retired as a U.S. Air Force lieutenant colonel after logging 9500 flight hours. Hoskins later become assistant vice president of student affairs at California State University in Hayward.

References

1927 births
2012 deaths
Congressional Gold Medal recipients
People from Contra Costa County, California
People from Big Sandy, Texas
Tuskegee Airmen
United States Air Force officers
University of Portland alumni
University of Southern California alumni
California State University, East Bay
American Korean War pilots
African-American aviators
Aviators from Texas
Aviators from California
21st-century African-American people
Military personnel from Texas